Tudhaliya III was a king of the Hittite Empire. In academic literature, this name can refer to two separate individuals. One is known under the Hurrian name Tasmi-Sarri. He could also be referred to as Tudhaliya II or Tudhaliya III.

The other was a short-lived king of the Hittite Empire (New Kingdom) ca. 1370 BC (middle chronology)  or 1344 BC (short chronology) also known as Tudhaliya the Younger (Amelie Kuhrt refers to him as Tudhaliya III).

This Tudhaliya the Younger was the son of Arnuwanda I, and the brother of Suppiluliuma I. He is not explicitly known to have been king at all.

According to Kuhrt (2020), Tudhaliya III (or II) was the  successor of Arnuwanda I. Further, Suppiluliuma I was the son and eventual heir of Tudhaliya II/III.

Tudhaliya II or III

Military situation 
At the time Tudhaliya II/III inherited the kingdom, the Hittites were under attack. 

While still at Hattusa, Tudhaliya wrote some letters to Masat Huyuk. Masat was later destroyed during Tudhaliya's reign, but it was then rebuilt under Suppiluliuma I. 

Two documents were found there that bear his seal together with the name of Great Queen Šatandu-Ḫepa, his first wife (:it:Satanduhepa). His second wife Tadu-Ḫepa is better known, and she survived as Great Queen into the reign of Suppiluliuma I. It seems that it was at some point during Tudhaliya’s reign that the capital was burnt down by the enemies of Kaska, and he had to move the capital elsewhere. This was the time known in literature as the ‘concentric invasions’ of Hatti.

Tudhaliya chose to make the city of Samuha, "an important cult centre located on the upper course of the Marassantiya river" as a temporary home for the Hittite royal court sometime after his abandonment of Hattusa in the face of attacks against his kingdom by the Kaska, Hayasa-Azzi and other enemies of his state.

Nevertheless, Samuha too was, in its turn, seized by the forces from the country of Azzi, so the capital had to be moved to Sapinuwa.

At this time, the kingdom of Hatti was so besieged by fierce attacks from its enemies that many neighbouring powers expected it to soon collapse. The Egyptian pharaoh, Amenhotep III, even wrote to Tarhundaradu, king of Arzawa: "I have heard that everything is finished and that the country of Hattusa is paralysed." (EA 31, 26–27)

However, Tudhaliya managed to rally his forces; indeed, the speed and determination of the Hittite king may have surprised Hatti's enemies including the Kaska and Hayasa-Azzi.

Defeat of Hayasa-Azzi 
Tudhaliya sent his general Suppiluliuma, who would later serve as king himself under the title Suppiluliuma I, to Hatti's northeastern frontiers, to defeat Hayasa-Azzi. The Hayasans initially retreated from a direct battle with the Hittite commander. The Hittitologist Trevor R. Bryce notes, however, that Tudhaliya and Suppiluliuma eventually:

 ... invaded Hayasa-Azzi and forced a showdown with its king Karanni (or Lanni) near the city of Kumaha. The passage (in the 'Deeds of Suppiluliuma') recording the outcome of this battle is missing. But almost certainly, the Hittite campaign resulted in the conquest of Hayasa-Azzi, for subsequently Suppiluliuma established it as a Hittite vassal state, drawing up a treaty with Hakkana, its current ruler.

The Hayasans were now obliged to repatriate all captured Hittite subjects and cede "the border [territory] which Suppiluliuma claimed belonged to the Land of Hatti."

Tudhaliya the Younger 
Some Hittite texts also refer to 'Tudhaliya the child' or, as an alternate translation, 'Tudhaliya the Young(er)'. 

According to Bilgin (2018) (based on the words of Mursili II), Tudhaliya the Younger, was the son and the intended heir of Tudhaliya II/III. Yet he was ‘eliminated’ by his brother Suppiluliuma I on his way to kingship. And so he was killed by a group of officers that included his successor Suppiluliuma I. So Tudhaliya the Younger was the brother of Suppiluliuma.

There is some difficulty concerning numbering of the Tudhaliyas (and Hattusilis) of the Hittite empire. This Tudhaliya the Younger is normally not included in Hittite king lists; his father will often be seen listed in modern literature as Tudhaliya II or III.

See also

 History of the Hittites

References

External links
Reign of Suppiluliuma I, discussing Tudhaliya

Hittite kings
14th-century BC people